Yanyovo is a rural locality (a selo) in Seletskoye Rural Settlement, Suzdalsky District, Vladimir Oblast, Russia. The population was 90 as of 2010. There are 6 streets.

Geography 
Yanyovo is located 9 km west of Suzdal (the district's administrative centre) by road. Krapivye is the nearest rural locality.

References 

Rural localities in Suzdalsky District
Suzdalsky Uyezd